Greatest Hits Volume I is a compilation album released by Barry Manilow in 1989 on Arista Records. It was the first of a three-album series released that year, along with Volume II and Volume III.

Track listing

All track information and credits were taken from the CD liner notes.

References

1989 greatest hits albums
Barry Manilow compilation albums
Arista Records compilation albums